Kaensak Sor.Ploenjit is a Thai former Muay Thai fighter and professional boxer. Lumpinee and Rajadamnern stadium champion, Fighter of the Year in 1989 and 1990, he was one of the most popular fighters of his generation.

Biography & career

Kaensak started training in Muay Thai at 9 years old with his father and had his first fight at 10. He joined the Taputhai camp in his native province of Samut Prakan then moved to the Sor.Ploenjit gym at 15 years old in order to start his Bangkok fighting career.

In 1989 Kaensak won the 112 lbs belt from both Lumpinee and Rajadamnern stadium and ended the year with a 9-0-1 record for which he was given the most prestigious title in Muay Thai The Sports Writers Association of Thailand Fighter of the Year award. Kaensak's dominance continued in 1990 and he won the Fighter of the Year award for a second time, becoming the first Nak Muay to win it two years in a row.  
At the peak of his popularity Kaensak had purses reaching 380,000 baht making him the highest paid fighter of his era in Muay Thai. He defeated legendary fighters such as Karuhat Sor.Supawan, Chatchai Paiseetong, Langsuan Phayutaphum or Lamnamoon Sor.Sumalee.

Kaensak retired from the Bangkok Stadiums circuit in 1997 with a record of 200+ wins, 40 defeats and 2 draws. In 2000 Kaensak moved to the United States where he became a Muay Thai instructor and judge. He came out of retirement multiple times fighting at a higher weight class against foreign champions Fabio Pinca and Tetsuya Yamato. He taught at AMA Fight Club in New Jersey, and now teaches at his own studio, Kaensak Muay Thai, which opened in 2020.

In professional boxing, he had only two fights, one win and one loss between 1996 and 1997.

Titles & honours
Lumpinee Stadium
 1989 Lumpinee Stadium 112 lbs Champion
 1989 Lumpinee Stadium Fighter of the Year
Rajadamnern Stadium
 1989 Rajadamnern Stadium 112 lbs Champion
World Council of Kickboxing
 2006 WCK World 140 lbs Champion
International Karate Kickboxing Council
 2007 IKKC World 140 lbs Champion
Awards
 1989 Sports Writers Association of Thailand Fighter of the Year
 1990 Sports Writers Association of Thailand Fighter of the Year
 1993 Sports Writers Association of Thailand Fight of the Year (vs Singdam Or.Ukrit)

Fight record

|- style="background:#fbb;"
| 2009-07-19 || Loss ||align=left| Tetsuya Yamato || Ultimate Warriors || Anaheim, United States || KO (Left body shot) || 5 || 2:59 
|-
! style=background:white colspan=9 |
|- style="background:#fbb;"
| 2008-07-19 || Loss ||align=left| Fabio Pinca || WCK: Full Rules Muay Thai, Pechanga Resort Casino|| Temecula, CA || Decision (Unanimous) || 5 || 3:00
|- style="background:#fbb;"
| 2007-09-08 || Loss ||align=left| Fabio Pinca || WBC Muay Thai Presents: World Championship Muay Thai || Gardena, CA || Decision (Split) || 5 || 3:00
|-
! style=background:white colspan=9 |
|- style="background:#cfc;"
| 2007-02- || Win||align=left| Raul Llopis || || New York, United States || Decision  || 5 || 3:00
|- style="background:#cfc;"
| 2000- || Win ||align=left| Andrea ||  || California, United States ||  ||  ||
|- style="background:#fbb"
| 1996-10-18 || Loss||align=left| Baiphet Loogjaomaesaiwaree || Lumpinee Stadium ||  Bangkok, Thailand  || Decision || 5 || 3:00
|- style="background:#fbb;"
| 1995-12-08 || Loss||align=left| Prabsuek Sitsantat|| Lumpinee Stadium ||  Bangkok, Thailand  || Decision || 5 || 3:00
|- style="background:#fbb;"
| 1995-09-18 || Loss||align=left| Muangfahlek Kiatwichian|| Rajadamnern Stadium ||  Bangkok, Thailand  || Decision || 5 || 3:00
|- style="background:#cfc;"
| 1995-08-25 || Win||align=left| Nungubon Sitlerchai || Lumpinee Stadium ||  Bangkok, Thailand  || Decision || 5 || 3:00
|- style="background:#fbb;"
| 1995-06-09 || Loss||align=left| Dokmaipa Por Pongsawang || Lumpinee Stadium ||  Bangkok, Thailand  || Decision || 5 || 3:00

|- style="background:#fbb;"
| 1995- || Loss||align=left| Cheangnern Sitputthapim || Lumpinee Stadium ||  Bangkok, Thailand  || Decision || 5 || 3:00
|- style="background:#fbb;"
| 1995-03-13 || Loss||align=left| Cheangnern Sitputthapim || Rajadamnern Stadium ||  Bangkok, Thailand  || Decision || 5 || 3:00
|- style="background:#fbb;"
| 1994-10-28 || Loss||align=left| Silapathai Jockygym || Lumpinee Stadium ||  Bangkok, Thailand  || Decision || 5 || 3:00
|- style="background:#cfc;"
| 1994-10-17 || Win||align=left| Hansuk Prasathinpanomrung || Lumpinee Stadium ||  Bangkok, Thailand  || Decision || 5 || 3:00
|- style="background:#cfc;"
| 1994-09-27 || Win||align=left| Hansuk Prasathinpanomrung || Lumpinee Stadium ||  Bangkok, Thailand  || Decision || 5 || 3:00
|- style="background:#fbb;"
| 1994-08-22 || Loss||align=left| Karuhat Sor.Supawan || Rajadamnern Stadium ||  Bangkok, Thailand  || Decision || 5 || 3:00
|- style="background:#fbb;"
| 1994-05-31 || Loss||align=left| Hansuk Prasathinpanomrung || Lumpinee Stadium ||  Bangkok, Thailand  || Decision || 5 || 3:00
|- style="background:#fbb;"
| 1994-03-25 || Loss ||align=left| Nungubon Sitlerchai|| Lumpinee Stadium ||  Bangkok, Thailand || Decision || 5 || 3:00
|- style="background:#fbb;"
| 1994-02-15 || Loss||align=left| Wangchannoi Sor Palangchai  || Lumpinee Stadium ||  Bangkok, Thailand  || Decision || 5 || 3:00
|- style="background:#cfc;"
| 1994-01-28 || Win||align=left| Chatchai Paiseetong|| Lumpinee Stadium ||  Bangkok, Thailand || Decision || 5 || 3:00
|- style="background:#cfc;"
| 1993-12-07 || Win||align=left| Lamnamoon Sor.Sumalee || Lumpinee Stadium ||  Bangkok, Thailand  || Decision || 5 || 3:00
|- style="background:#c5d2ea"
| 1993-10-16 || Draw||align=left| Lamnamoon Sor.Sumalee || Rajadamnern Stadium || Bangkok, Thailand  || Decision || 5 || 3:00
|- style="background:#cfc;"
| 1993-09-17 || Win ||align=left| Nungubon Sitlerchai|| Lumpinee Stadium ||  Bangkok, Thailand || Decision || 5 || 3:00
|- style="background:#fbb;"
| 1993-07-13 || Loss||align=left| Singdam Or.Ukrit || Lumpinee Stadium ||  Bangkok, Thailand  || Decision || 5 || 3:00
|- style="background:#cfc;"
| 1993-06-08 || Win||align=left| Lamnamoon Sor.Sumalee || Lumpinee Stadium ||  Bangkok, Thailand  || Decision || 5 || 3:00
|- style="background:#fbb;"
| 1993-04-06 || Loss||align=left| Karuhat Sor.Supawan || Lumpinee Stadium ||  Bangkok, Thailand  || Decision || 5 || 3:00
|- style="background:#cfc"
| 1993-01-08 || Win ||align=left| Jaroensap Kiatbanchong || Lumpinee Stadium ||  Bangkok, Thailand  || Decision || 5 || 3:00
|- style="background:#fbb;"
| 1992-12-04 || Loss||align=left| Jaroensap Kiatbanchong || Lumpinee Stadium ||  Bangkok, Thailand  ||Decision || 5 || 3:00
|-
! style=background:white colspan=9 |
|- style="background:#cfc;"
| 1992-10-27 || Win||align=left| Vicharn Sitchuchon || Lumpinee Stadium || Bangkok, Thailand  || Decision || 5 || 3:00
|- style="background:#cfc;"
| 1992-07-27 || Win||align=left| Dokmaipa Por Pongsawang || Rajadamnern Stadium || Bangkok, Thailand  || Decision || 5 || 3:00
|- style="background:#cfc;"
| 1991-03-19 || Win||align=left| Taweesaklek Ploysakda || Lumpinee Stadium ||  Bangkok, Thailand  || Decision || 5 || 3:00
|- style="background:#cfc;"
| 1990-12-26 || Win||align=left| Taweesaklek Ploysakda || Rajadamnern Stadium ||  Bangkok, Thailand || Decision || 5 || 3:00
|- style="background:#c5d2ea"
| 1990-10-22 || Draw||align=left| Veeraphol Sahaprom || Rajadamnern Stadium ||  Bangkok, Thailand  || Decision || 5 || 3:00
|- style="background:#cfc;"
| 1990-08-30 || Win||align=left| Santos Devy || Rajadamnern Stadium ||  Bangkok, Thailand  || Decision || 5 || 3:00
|- style="background:#cfc;"
| 1990-08-06 || Win||align=left| Eakapol Chuwattana || Rajadamnern Stadium ||  Bangkok, Thailand || Decision || 5 || 3:00
|- style="background:#cfc;"
| 1990-04-26 || Win||align=left| Suwitlek Lookbangplasoi || Rajadamnern Stadium ||  Bangkok, Thailand  || Decision || 5 || 3:00
|- style="background:#fbb;"
| 1990-03-21 || Loss ||align=left| Santos Devy || Rajadamnern Stadium ||  Bangkok, Thailand  || Decision || 5 || 3:00
|- style="background:#cfc;"
| 1989-10-27 || Win||align=left| Peemai Or.Yuttanakorn || Lumpinee Stadium || Bangkok, Thailand  || Decision || 5 || 3:00
|- style="background:#cfc;"
| 1989-09-26 || Win||align=left| Langsuan Panyuthaphum || Lumpinee Stadium ||  Bangkok, Thailand  || Decision || 5 || 3:00
|- style="background:#c5d2ea"
| 1989-09-05 || Draw||align=left| Langsuan Panyuthaphum || Lumpinee Stadium ||  Bangkok, Thailand || Decision || 5 || 3:00
|-
! style=background:white colspan=9 |
|- style="background:#cfc;"
| 1989-07-25 || Win||align=left| Karuhat Sor.Supawan || Lumpinee Stadium ||  Bangkok, Thailand  || Decision || 5 || 3:00
|- style="background:#cfc;"
| 1989-06-05 || Win||align=left| Denhnue Denmoree || Rajadamnern Stadium ||  Bangkok, Thailand  || Decision || 5 || 3:00
|-
! style=background:white colspan=9 |
|- style="background:#cfc;"
| 1989-05-02 || Win||align=left| Paruhatlek Sitchunthong || Lumpinee Stadium ||  Bangkok, Thailand  || Decision || 5 || 3:00
|-
! style=background:white colspan=9 |
|- style="background:#cfc;"
| 1989-02-21 || Win||align=left| Seesot Sahaganosot || Lumpinee Stadium ||  Bangkok, Thailand  || Decision || 5 || 3:00
|- style="background:#cfc;"
| 1989-01-31 || Win||align=left| Seksan Sitjomtong || Lumpinee Stadium ||  Bangkok, Thailand  || Decision || 5 || 3:00
|- style="background:#cfc;"
| 1989-01-07 || Win||align=left| Panpetch Muangsurin || Lumpinee Stadium ||  Bangkok, Thailand  || Decision || 5 || 3:00
|- style="background:#fbb;"
| 1988-11-25 || Loss ||align=left| Phetchan Sor Bodin || Lumpinee Stadium ||  Bangkok, Thailand  || Decision || 5 || 3:00
|- style="background:#cfc;"
| 1988-08-30 || Win ||align=left| Thammachart Meungphatalung || Lumpinee Stadium ||  Bangkok, Thailand  || Decision || 5 || 3:00
|- style="background:#fbb;"
| 1988-07-26 || Loss ||align=left| Phanpetch Muangsurin || Lumpinee Stadium ||  Bangkok, Thailand  || Decision || 5 || 3:00
|- style="background:#fbb;"
| 1988-03-15 || Loss ||align=left| Karuhat Sor.Supawan || Lumpinee Stadium ||  Bangkok, Thailand  || Decision || 5 || 3:00
|- style="background:#cfc;"
| 1986- || Win||align=left| Fahsatan Lukprabath ||  || Bangkok, Thailand || Decision || 5 || 3:00
|-
! style=background:white colspan=9 |
|-
| colspan=9 | Legend:

References

External links
 KAENSAK MUAYTHAI GYM

1970 births
Living people
Kaensak Sor.Ploenjit
Muay Thai trainers
Kaensak Sor.Ploenjit
Kaensak Sor.Ploenjit